Kabud Gonbad (also Romanized as Kabūd Gonbad; also known as Keymaty, Qeshlāq-e Yūzābād, Qesmatī, Qeymati, and Qishlaq Qimati) is a village in Dizmar-e Markazi Rural District, Kharvana District, Varzaqan County, East Azerbaijan Province, Iran. At the 2006 census, its population was 214, in 45 families.

References 

Towns and villages in Varzaqan County